Gareth Bowen (born 20 June 1979) is a Welsh former rugby union footballer who played as a fly-half. Born in Aberdare, he played for Bridgend, Bedford, Bristol, Llanelli, Scarlets, Neath, Aurillac, Ebbw Vale and Newport.

Career
After spending time with Bridgend and in England with Bedford and Bristol, Wales under-21 international Bowen joined Llanelli for the inaugural season of the Celtic League in 2001 and shared duties at fly-half with Stephen Jones. His performances earned him a call-up to both the Wales Sevens and Wales 'A' teams in October 2001, although in February 2002, he had to fly home from Sevens duty in New Zealand to cover for Jones who had been ordered to miss a game against Ebbw Vale to guard him against injury ahead of the 2002 Six Nations.

In 2003, regional rugby came to Wales and Bowen and Jones were named as the two fly-halves for the Llanelli-based region, the Llanelli Scarlets; however, the start of the 2003–04 season coincided with the 2003 Rugby World Cup in Australia, which meant Jones was unavailable and Bowen started at fly-half for the first 10 games in the history of the Scarlets. Jones returned from the World Cup as first-choice, but the 2004 Six Nations Championship meant Bowen had another run in the team before the end of the season and he signed a new contract with the Scarlets in April 2004. Jones left for French side Clermont in the summer of 2004, and failed moves for New Zealander Andrew Mehrtens and France's Gérald Merceron meant Bowen was now considered the Scarlets' first-choice fly-half, although the newly signed Arwel Thomas and the young Ceiron Thomas challenged him for the starting position at various points in the 2004–05 season.

In 2005–06, the Scarlets signed United States international Mike Hercus as competition for Bowen, limiting Bowen to just 10 starts during the season, although in October 2005, he was included as part of Wales' training squad for the 2005 Autumn internationals. The return of Stephen Jones to the Scarlets and the emergence of Ceiron Thomas saw Bowen omitted from the Scarlets' 38-man squad for the 2006–07 Heineken Cup; his only appearance for the region in 2006–07 came as a replacement in a pre-season friendly against Gloucester in August 2006, and he was limited to eight competitive appearances for Llanelli RFC before his contract was terminated in November 2006. Despite interest from Leeds Tykes, he was almost immediately signed by Neath, who were seeking a replacement at fly-half for James Hook, who had been promoted to the Ospreys regional side.

Bowen left Wales for France in the summer of 2007, signing for second-division side Aurillac but returned to sign for his first club, Bridgend, in July 2008. A year later, he moved to Ebbw Vale before joining Newport in 2010, where he spent two years before retiring.

References

External links
Pre-regional era Llanelli RFC and Scarlets stats
Regional era Llanelli RFC stats
Newport RFC stats

1979 births
Living people
Rugby union players from Aberdare
Welsh rugby union players
Rugby union fly-halves
Bridgend RFC players
Bedford Blues players
Bristol Bears players
Llanelli RFC players
Scarlets players
Neath RFC players
Ebbw Vale RFC players
Newport RFC players